The Clearwater River is a  tributary of the Mississippi River in central Minnesota, United States.

It rises in southern Stearns County and flows south into Meeker County, passing the town of Watkins. It turns east and enters a chain of lakes, eventually becoming the border between Stearns County and Wright County, passing the town of Fairhaven and entering Clearwater Lake. Upon leaving the lake, the river flows northeast, joining the Mississippi River at Clearwater.

See also
List of rivers of Minnesota

References

Minnesota Watersheds
USGS Geographic Names Information Service
USGS Hydrologic Unit Map - State of Minnesota (1974)

Rivers of Minnesota
Rivers of Stearns County, Minnesota
Rivers of Meeker County, Minnesota
Rivers of Wright County, Minnesota
Tributaries of the Mississippi River
Clearwater, Minnesota